The 2008 Georgia Bulldogs baseball team represented the University of Georgia in the 2008 NCAA Division I baseball season. The Bulldogs played their home games at Foley Field. The team was coached by David Perno in his 7th season at Georgia.

The Bulldogs lost the College World Series, defeated by the Fresno State Bulldogs in the championship series.

Roster

Schedule 

! style="" | Regular Season
|- valign="top" 

|- align="center" bgcolor="#ccffcc" 
| February 22 || Arizona || Foley Field • Athens, GA || 9–7 || 1–0 || –
|- align="center" bgcolor="#ffcccc"
| February 23 || Arizona || Foley Field • Athens, GA || 1–7 || 1–1 || –
|- align="center" bgcolor="#ffcccc"
| February 24 || Arizona || Foley Field • Athens, GA || 8–9 || 1–2 || –
|- align="center" bgcolor="#bbbbbb"
| February 27 || at Atlanta Braves || Champion Stadium • Lake Buena Vista, FL || 0–8 || 1–2 || –
|- align="center" bgcolor="#ffcccc"
| February 29 || vs #12  || PGE Park • Portland, OR || 4–6 || 1–3 || –
|-

|- align="center" bgcolor="#ccffcc" 
| March 1 || vs #12 Oregon State || PGE Park • Portland, OR || 10–5 || 2–3 || –
|- align="center" bgcolor="#ffcccc" 
| March 2 || vs #12 Oregon State || PGE Park • Portland, OR || 4–5 || 2–4 || –
|- align="center" bgcolor="#ccffcc" 
| March 5 ||  || Foley Field • Athens, GA || 19–1 || 3–4 || –
|- align="center" bgcolor="#ccffcc" 
| March 7 ||  || Foley Field • Athens, GA || 8–1 || 4–4 || –
|- align="center" bgcolor="#ccffcc" 
| March 8 || Memphis || Foley Field • Athens, GA || 8–2 || 5–4 || –
|- align="center" bgcolor="#ffcccc" 
| March 9 || Memphis || Foley Field • Athens, GA || 6–7 || 5–5 || –
|- align="center" bgcolor="#bbbbbb" 
| March 11 || at #3 Florida State || Mike Martin Field at Dick Howser Stadium • Tallahassee, FL || Cancelled || 5–5 || –
|- align="center" bgcolor="#ccffcc" 
| March 12 || at #3 Florida State || Mike Martin Field at Dick Howser Stadium • Tallahassee, FL || 13–10 || 6–5 || –
|- align="center" bgcolor="#ffcccc" 
| March 12 || at #3 Florida State || Mike Martin Field at Dick Howser Stadium • Tallahassee, FL || 3–8 || 6–6 || –
|- align="center" bgcolor="#ffcccc" 
| March 14 || at #21  || Baum–Walker Stadium • Fayetteville, AR || 1–5 || 6–7 || 0–1
|- align="center" bgcolor="#ccffcc" 
| March 15 || at #21 Arkansas || Baum–Walker Stadium • Fayetteville, AR || 15–11 || 7–7 || 1–1
|- align="center" bgcolor="#ccffcc" 
| March 16 || at #21 Arkansas || Baum–Walker Stadium • Fayetteville, AR || 13–2 || 8–7 || 2–1
|- align="center" bgcolor="#ccffcc" 
| March 18 ||  || Foley Field • Athens, GA || 8–3 || 9–7 || 2–1
|- align="center" bgcolor="#ccffcc" 
| March 19 ||  || Foley Field • Athens, GA || 18–3 || 10–7 || 2–1
|- align="center" bgcolor="#ccffcc" 
| March 21 ||  || Foley Field • Athens, GA || 6–2 || 11–7 || 3–1
|- align="center" bgcolor="#ccffcc" 
| March 22 || Tennessee || Foley Field • Athens, GA || 3–2 || 12–7 || 4–1
|- align="center" bgcolor="#ffcccc" 
| March 23 || Tennessee || Foley Field • Athens, GA || 3–4 || 12–8 || 4–2
|- align="center" bgcolor="#ccffcc" 
| March 25 || at  || Fred Stillwell Stadium • Kennesaw, GA || 12–5 || 13–8 || 4–2
|- align="center" bgcolor="#ffcccc" 
| March 26 || Kennesaw State || Foley Field • Athens, GA || 6–8 || 13–9 || 4–2
|- align="center" bgcolor="#ffcccc" 
| March 28 || at Mississippi State || Dudy Noble Field • Starkville, MS || 2–3 || 13–10 || 4–3
|- align="center" bgcolor="#ccffcc" 
| March 29 || at Mississippi State || Dudy Noble Field • Starkville, MS || 5–1 || 14–10 || 5–3
|- align="center" bgcolor="#ccffcc" 
| March 30 || at Mississippi State || Dudy Noble Field • Starkville, MS || 5–3 || 15–10 || 6–3
|-

|- align="center" bgcolor="#ccffcc" 
| April 1 || #17 Clemson || Foley Field • Athens, GA || 11–3 || 16–10 || 6–3
|- align="center" bgcolor="#ccffcc" 
| April 2 || at #17 Clemson || Doug Kingsmore Stadium • Clemson, SC || 6–4 || 17–10 || 6–3
|- align="center" bgcolor="#ccffcc" 
| April 4 || #9  || Foley Field • Athens, GA || 1–0 || 18–10 || 7–3
|- align="center" bgcolor="#ccffcc" 
| April 5 || #9 South Carolina || Foley Field • Athens, GA || 5–3 || 19–10 || 8–3
|- align="center" bgcolor="#ccffcc" 
| April 6 || #9 South Carolina || Foley Field • Athens, GA || 4–2 || 20–10 || 9–3
|- align="center" bgcolor="#ffcccc" 
| April 8 ||  || Foley Field • Athens, GA || 1–5 || 20–11 || 9–3
|- align="center" bgcolor="#ffcccc" 
| April 9 || at #10  || Russ Chandler Stadium • Atlanta, GA || 4–9 || 20–12 || 9–3
|- align="center" bgcolor="#ccffcc" 
| April 11 || #9 Kentucky || Foley Field • Athens, GA || 3–2 || 21–12 || 10–3
|- align="center" bgcolor="#ccffcc" 
| April 12 || #9 Kentucky || Foley Field • Athens, GA || 13–4 || 22–12 || 11–3
|- align="center" bgcolor="#ccffcc" 
| April 13 || #9 Kentucky || Foley Field • Athens, GA || 6–4 || 23–12 || 12–3
|- align="center" bgcolor="#ccffcc" 
| April 15 ||  || Foley Field • Athens, GA || 9–8 || 24–12 || 12–3
|- align="center" bgcolor="#ccffcc" 
| April 16 ||  || Foley Field • Athens, GA || 7–5 || 25–12 || 12–3
|- align="center" bgcolor="#ccffcc" 
| April 18 || at LSU || Alex Box Stadium • Baton Rouge, LA || 6–3 || 26–12 || 13–3
|- align="center" bgcolor="#ccffcc" 
| April 19 || at LSU || Alex Box Stadium • Athens, GA || 9–8 || 27–12 || 14–3
|- align="center" bgcolor="#bbbbbb" 
| April 20 || at LSU || Alex Box Stadium • Athens, GA || 10–10 || 27–12–1 || 14–3–1
|- align="center" bgcolor="#ccffcc" 
| April 22 || Kennesaw State || Foley Field • Athens, GA || 6–2 || 28–12–1 || 14–3–1
|- align="center" bgcolor="#ccffcc" 
| April 25 || at Florida || Alfred A. McKethan Stadium • Gainesville, FL || 7–4 || 29–12–1 || 15–3–1
|- align="center" bgcolor="#ffcccc" 
| April 26 || at Florida || Alfred A. McKethan Stadium • Gainesville, FL || 2–7 || 29–13–1 || 15–4–1
|- align="center" bgcolor="#ffcccc" 
| April 27 || at Florida || Alfred A. McKethan Stadium • Gainesville, FL || 2–7 || 29–14–1 || 15–5–1
|-

|- align="center" bgcolor="#ccffcc" 
| May 2 || #25  || Foley Field • Athens, GA || 5–4 || 30–14–1 || 16–5–1
|- align="center" bgcolor="#ffcccc" 
| May 3 || #25 Ole Miss || Foley Field • Athens, GA || 4–9 || 30–15–1 || 16–6–1
|- align="center" bgcolor="#ccffcc" 
| May 4 || #25 Ole Miss || Foley Field • Athens, GA || 11–4 || 31–15–1 || 17–6–1
|- align="center" bgcolor="#ffcccc" 
| May 7 || #25 Georgia Tech || Foley Field • Athens, GA || 1–11 || 31–16–1 || 17–6–1
|- align="center" bgcolor="#ffcccc" 
| May 9 || at #16 Vanderbilt || Hawkins Field • Nashville, TN || 7–13 || 31–17–1 || 17–7–1
|- align="center" bgcolor="#ccffcc" 
| May 10 || at #16 Vanderbilt || Hawkins Field • Nashville, TN || 4–2 || 32–17–1 || 18–7–1
|- align="center" bgcolor="#ccffcc" 
| May 11 || at #16 Vanderbilt || Hawkins Field • Nashville, TN || 12–10 || 33–17–1 || 19–7–1
|- align="center" bgcolor="#ccffcc" 
| May 13 || vs #25 Georgia Tech || Turner Field • Atlanta, GA || 3–2 || 34–17–1 || 19–7–1
|- align="center" bgcolor="#ffcccc" 
| May 15 ||  || Foley Field • Athens, GA || 13–17 || 34–18–1 || 19–8–1
|- align="center" bgcolor="#ccffcc" 
| May 16 || Alabama || Foley Field • Athens, GA || 5–4 || 35–18–1 || 20–8–1
|- align="center" bgcolor="#ffcccc" 
| May 17 || Alabama || Foley Field • Athens, GA || 13–16 || 35–19–1 || 20–9–1
|-

|-
! style="" | Postseason
|-

|- align="center" bgcolor="#ffcccc" 
| May 21 || vs Ole Miss || Hoover Metropolitan Stadium • Hoover, AL || 1–4 || 35–20–1 || 20–9–1
|- align="center" bgcolor="#ffcccc" 
| May 22 || vs Alabama || Hoover Metropolitan Stadium • Hoover, AL || 2–5 || 35–21–1 || 20–9–1
|-

|- align="center" bgcolor="#ffcccc" 
| May 30 ||  || Foley Field • Athens, GA || 7–10 || 35–22–1 || 20–9–1
|- align="center" bgcolor="#ccffcc" 
| May 31 || Lipscomb || Foley Field • Athens, GA || 9–8 || 36–22–1 || 20–9–1
|- align="center" bgcolor="#ccffcc" 
| June 1 || Lipscomb || Foley Field • Athens, GA || 14–3 || 37–22–1 || 20–9–1
|- align="center" bgcolor="#ccffcc" 
| June 1 || Georgia Tech || Foley Field • Athens, GA || 8–0 || 38–22–1 || 20–9–1
|- align="center" bgcolor="#ccffcc" 
| June 2 || Georgia Tech || Foley Field • Athens, GA || 18–6 || 39–22–1 || 20–9–1
|-

|- align="center" bgcolor="#ccffcc" 
| June 6 || #15  || Foley Field • Athens, GA || 11–4 || 40–22–1 || 20–9–1
|- align="center" bgcolor="#ffcccc" 
| June 7 || #15 NC State || Foley Field • Athens, GA || 6–10 || 40–23–1 || 20–9–1
|- align="center" bgcolor="#ccffcc" 
| June 8 || #15 NC State || Foley Field • Athens, GA || 17–8 || 41–23–1 || 20–9–1
|-

|- align="center" bgcolor="#ccffcc" 
| June 14 || vs #1 Miami (FL) || Johnny Rosenblatt Stadium • Omaha, NE || 7–4 || 42–23–1 || 20–9–1
|- align="center" bgcolor="#ccffcc" 
| June 16 || vs #7 Stanford || Johnny Rosenblatt Stadium • Omaha, NE || 4–3 || 43–23–1 || 20–9–1
|- align="center" bgcolor="#ccffcc" 
| June 20 || vs #7 Stanford || Johnny Rosenblatt Stadium • Omaha, NE || 10–8 || 44–23–1 || 20–9–1
|- align="center" bgcolor="#ccffcc" 
| June 23 || vs #8 Fresno State || Johnny Rosenblatt Stadium • Omaha, NE || 7–6 || 45–23–1 || 20–9–1
|- align="center" bgcolor="#ffcccc" 
| June 24 || vs #8 Fresno State || Johnny Rosenblatt Stadium • Omaha, NE || 10–19 || 45–24–1 || 20–9–1
|- align="center" bgcolor="#ffcccc" 
| June 25 || vs #8 Fresno State || Johnny Rosenblatt Stadium • Omaha, NE || 1–6 || 45–25–1 || 20–9–1
|-

Awards and honors 
Gordon Beckham
 Southeastern Conference Baseball Player of the Year
 Baseball America First Team All-American
 Collegiate Baseball First Team All-American
 National Collegiate Baseball Writers Association First Team All-American
 American Baseball Coaches Association First Team All-American
 All-Tournament Team<

Ryan Peisel
 All-Tournament Team

Joshua Fields
 Baseball America Second Team All-American
 Collegiate Baseball First Team All-American
 National Collegiate Baseball Writers Association First Team All-American
 American Baseball Coaches Association Second Team All-American

Bulldogs in the 2008 MLB Draft 
The following members of the Georgia Bulldogs baseball program were drafted in the 2008 Major League Baseball Draft.

References 

Georgia Bulldogs baseball seasons
College World Series seasons
Georgia Bulldogs
Georgia
2008 NCAA Division I baseball tournament participants